Verrens-Arvey is a commune in the Savoie department in the Auvergne-Rhône-Alpes region in south-eastern France.

Geography
The Chéran has its source in the north-western part of the commune. The Verrens, a tributary of the Isère, forms the commune's south-western border.

Climate

Verrens-Arvey has a oceanic climate (Köppen climate classification Cfb).

See also
Communes of the Savoie department

References

Communes of Savoie